Tarantella is a type of Italian folk dance.

Tarantella or Tarantelle (in French) may also refer to:

Film and television
 Tarantella (1940 film), a short film
 Tarantella (1995 film), a film with Mira Sorvino and Matthew Lillard
 "Tarantella" (Grimm), an episode of Grimm

Other uses
 Tarantella (ballet), a ballet choreographed by George Balanchine
 Tarantella (catamaran), a historic catamaran designed by Nathanael Greene Herreshoff
 Tarantelle (Chopin),  a short piano piece in tarantella form by Frédéric Chopin 
 Tarantella (horse) (foaled 1830), a British Thoroughbred racehorse
 Tarantella, Inc., a software company
 Tarantella Night Club, a building in Western Australia

See also
 Nocturne and Tarantella (Szymanowski), a composition for violin and piano
 Tarantella Serpentine, a character in The Illuminatus! Trilogy
 Gabriella Tarantello (born 1958), Italian mathematician
 Tarantula (disambiguation)
 Tarentel (band), a band based in San Francisco, California